Body shot(s) may refer to:

Entertainment
 Body Shots (film), a 1999 American film
 "Body Shots" (song), a 2010 song by Kaci Battaglia

Other
 Body shot, hitting one's opponent with the ball in the sport of pickleball
 Body shot, a form of food play in which alcohol is consumed from another's body
 Liver shot, a kick, punch or knee strike to the torso